Adam Hinshelwood (born 8 January 1984) is an English football manager and former player who manages Worthing. He is the son of ex-England under-21 and Crystal Palace footballer Paul Hinshelwood. His grandfather Wally Hinshelwood was also a professional footballer.

Playing career

Brighton & Hove Albion 
Hinshelwood was born in Oxford and joined Brighton & Hove Albion as a trainee. He turned professional in August 2002, while his uncle, Martin Hinshelwood was Brighton manager. He made his league debut on 10 August 2002 in a 3–1 victory away to Burnley, picking up man-of-the-match honours from the sports press. He made more than 40 appearances in the Championship for Brighton over the next couple of seasons, playing so well that he was selected for the England U21 squad for games against Wales and Azerbaijan in October 2004.

Shortly after this call up, he was about to receive a letter from the F.A. informing him that he was being considered for the Toulon Tournament in the summer of 2005, when the results of a scan showed that he had ruptured his ACL. Returning from this injury in the 2006–07 season, Hinshelwood even captained the Brighton side, becoming one of the youngest captains in club history. A second ACL surgery was followed by two more minor surgeries to repair surface damage. Upon his return from rehabilitation, Hinshelwood was loaned to Lewes, where he helped the struggling Conference team win three of the five games in which he played, his form prompting Brighton to recall him early from his loan spell.

It was announced on 12 May 2009, that Hinshelwood would be leaving Brighton after the expiration of his contract at the end of June 2009.

Aldershot Town 
Hinshelwood signed for Aldershot Town on 28 July 2009 on a one-year deal. On 6 August Aldershot Town manager Gary Waddock announced that Hinshelwood would be the captain for the 2009–10 season.

Wycombe Wanderers 
Hinshelwood subsequently signed for Wycombe Wanderers on 1 January 2010 on a free transfer, until the end of the season. He became Wycombe's club captain in early March, taking the armband from previous captain Craig Woodman. On 14 July 2010, Hinshelwood announced his retirement from football due to a serious knee injury.

Post-playing career 
For the 2011–12 season Hinshelwood was appointed assistant manager of non-league club Hastings United His tenure was short lived, and he decided to follow in his family's footsteps by becoming the manager of Sussex County League side, Selsey, replacing former manager Ian Martin. However, he left this post in November 2013, to become manager of Worthing. He then left Worthing in 2015 to become a full-time coach at Brighton & Hove Albion. Hinshelwood returned to Worthing in 2017 and led them to the Isthmian Premier Division title in the 2021–22 season.

Honours

As a manager
Worthing
Isthmian League Premier Division Champions: 2021–22

Individual
National League South Manager of the Month: January 2023

References

External links
Adam Hinshelwood player profile at Aldershot Town FC

1984 births
Living people
English footballers
Footballers from Oxford
Association football defenders
English Football League players
National League (English football) players
Brighton & Hove Albion F.C. players
Lewes F.C. players
Aldershot Town F.C. players
Wycombe Wanderers F.C. players
English football managers
Hastings United F.C. managers
Selsey F.C. managers
Worthing F.C. managers
Isthmian League managers
National League (English football) managers